Perebor is a rural locality (a village) in Zelentsovskoye Rural Settlement, Nikolsky District, Vologda Oblast, Russia. The population was 23 as of 2002.

Geography 
Perebor is located 61 km northwest of Nikolsk (the district's administrative centre) by road. Senino is the nearest rural locality.

References 

Rural localities in Nikolsky District, Vologda Oblast